Abdul Ghani or Abdulghani or Abdelghani or similar variants is a male Muslim given name, and in modern usage, surname. It is built from the Arabic words Abd, al- and Ghani. The name means "servant of the All-sufficient", Al-Ghaniyy being one of the names of God in the Qur'an, which give rise to the Muslim theophoric names. 

The letter a of the al- is unstressed, and can be transliterated by almost any vowel, often by u. The last element may appear as Gani, Ghany or in other ways, with the whole name subject to variable spacing and hyphenation. 

There is also the West African variant Abdul Ganiyu. 

It may refer to:

Given name
Abdul Ghani Saheb Saudagar (1843-1897), Nawab of Kholapur, Maharashtra, India
Abdul Gani (soldier) (1919–1957), Bengali military officer
Abdel Ghani el-Gamasy (1921–2003), Egyptian soldier
Abdul Ghani Lone (1932–2002), Indian lawyer and politician
Abdul Ghani Minhat (born 1935), Malaysian footballer
Abdul Ghani Othman (born 1946), politician in Johor, Malaysia
Abdelghani Djaadaoui, or just Abdel Djaadaoui (born 1947), Algerian footballer
Abdul Gani Patail (born 1955), Malaysian lawyer
Abdul Ghani Baradar, co-founder and political leader of the Afghan Taliban
Abdelghani Mzoudi (born 1972), Moroccan accused in Germany of terrorism
Abdul Ghani Rahman (born 1985), Malaysian footballer
Abdul Ghani Ahmad, Malaysian politician
 Abdul Ghani Azhari, Indian Islamic scholar

Middle name
Khan Abdul Ghani Khan (1914–1996), Pashtun-nationalist poet
Emad Abdul-Ghani Sabouni (born 1964), Syrian politician
Hussein Abdulghani Sulaimani, or just Hussein Sulaimani (born 1977), Saudi footballer

Surname
Khwaja Abdul Ghani (1813–1896), Nawab of Dhaka
Mohamed Ben Ahmed Abdelghani (1927–1996), Algerian politician
Abdul Aziz Abdul Ghani (1939–2011), Yemeni politician
Magdi Abdelghani (born 1959), Egyptian footballer
Mohamed Abdulghani, Somali politician
Alaa Abdel-Ghany (born 1979), Egyptian footballer
Ahmed Abdel-Ghani (born 1981), Egyptian footballer
Safwan Abdul-Ghani (born 1983), Iraqi footballer
Amran Abdul Ghani, Malaysian politician
Abdulrahman Abd Ghani, former President of the Somali Region

Nicknames
Abdul Ghani Afghan, former Guantanamo detainee (ISN 934). See List of Afghan detainees at Guantanamo Bay /Abdul Ghani 
Abdul Ghani (Guantanamo detainee 943), Afghan, former Guantanamo detainee (ISN 943). See List of Afghan detainees at Guantanamo Bay /Abdul Ghani

See also
Abdul Ganiyu

References

Arabic masculine given names